Pilėnai is a village in Kėdainiai district municipality, in Kaunas County, in central Lithuania. According to the 2011 census, the village had a population of 2 people. It is located 1 km from Alksnėnai, by the Vilnius-Šiauliai railway.

Demography

References

Villages in Kaunas County
Kėdainiai District Municipality